Darreh Chapi (also Romanized as Darreh Chapī and Darreh-ye Chapī; also known as Darrehchī) is a village in Hemmatabad Rural District, in the Central District of Borujerd County, Lorestan Province, Iran. At the 2006 census, its population was 56, in 11 families.

References 

Towns and villages in Borujerd County